The 2002 UCLA Bruins men's soccer team represented the University of California, Los Angeles during the 2002 NCAA Division I men's soccer season. The Bruins won their fourth NCAA title this season, defeating Pac-10 rivals, Stanford, in the championship. To date, this is UCLA's most recent College Cup title. It was the 66th season the Bruins fielded a men's varsity soccer team, and their 11th season playing in the Pacific-10 Conference (now the Pac-12).

Background 
The 2001 UCLA team was coached by Todd Saldana, who finished the 2001 season with a 12-7-4 overall record. Saldana was forced to resign by the university after it was discovered that he had yet to complete his undergraduate degree. Fitzgerald, a former coach of Major League Soccer's Columbus Crew was hired to coach the program in February 2002.

Roster

Schedule 

Numbers in superscript text represent the team's NSCAA ranking.

Exhibitions

Regular season

NCAA Tournament 

No. (#) Rankings from NSCAA Poll. (#) Tournament seedings in parentheses.

College Cup

References

External links 
 UCLA 2002 Schedule and Results

2002
2002 Pacific-10 Conference men's soccer season
2002 in sports in California
NCAA Division I Men's Soccer Tournament-winning seasons
NCAA Division I Men's Soccer Tournament College Cup seasons